Group Captain William Michael Cross OBE (1942 – 9 November 2022) was a British Royal Air Force officer who was Chief of Staff of the Air Cadet Organisation. He retired from the post in 2006.

Trek to the South Pole
On 17 January 2003 Mike Cross, aged 60, became the eldest person to travel to the South Pole and, along with his son William Cross, became the first diabetes sufferer to reach the South Pole. Michael and his son William are also the first father and son team to make the journey.

Personal life and death
Cross died on 9 November 2022, at the age of 80.

References

1942 births
2022 deaths
Royal Air Force Air Cadets
Royal Air Force officers
University at Buffalo alumni